Phaulacantha metamelas is a moth of the family Tortricidae. It is found in Thailand and eastern Borneo.

The wingspan is 14 mm. The forewings are pale grey, marbled with darker grey with pale blue submetallic transverse bands on the costa. The hindwings are light fuscous grey.

References

Moths described in 1973
Olethreutini